Walter T. West was an American politician and farmer. He served for one term in the Oregon House of Representatives from 1905 to 1907, representing the 14 District. He was a member of the Republican Party.

Biography
Walter T. West was born on May 24, 1845 in Wisconsin to his parents D. V. T. and Mary West. Following his education, West became employed as a bridge builder in Jackson County, Wisconsin and later under the employ of the Illinois Central Railroad. In 1869, West married Mary Farmer who was from Union County, Illinois. The two moved to a farm in Dakota County, Minnesota before finally settling in Norman County, Minnesota in 1874 Two years later the West family moved to Stearns County, Minnesota. After eight years of farming in Minnesota, West and his family moved to Tillamook County, Oregon where Mary West's (née Farmer) father had settled. The West family arrived in Tillamook on May 20, 1884 and purchased their farm on October 4, 1884. West's farm had several dairy cows.

West was nominated by the Republican Party as Justice of the Peace for the third district in 1902. West also served as the director of the Tillamook School District for a total of 13 years. At the state Republican Party convention in 1904, West was nominated as their candidate for the 14 District of the Oregon House of Representatives, which encompassed Tillamook and Yamhill counties. His opponent was C. W. Talmage who was nominated by the Democratic Party. During the June general election, West defeated Talmage. West only served one term in the legislature and was succeeded by A. G. Beals.

In 1906, West moved his family to Newberg, Oregon. They briefly lived in tents while they constructed their home. Coates. a farmer by trade, was appointed to the Newberg Apple Growers Association in 1910. In 1915, he was appointed to the board of directors to the Newberg Co-operative Growers Association. The same year, West was appointed to the board of director of the Newberg Cannery. West's farm was known as West & Son, which specialized in prunes and dried berries. By 1921, his farm had 800 plum trees.

It is unclear what West's exact date of death was, but estate proceedings on his property began in 1932.

References

1845 births
Farmers from Wisconsin
People from Tillamook County, Oregon
Republican Party members of the Oregon House of Representatives
Year of death uncertain
People from Newberg, Oregon
Farmers from Oregon
American justices of the peace